The following is a list of pipeline accidents in the United States in 2005. It is one of several lists of U.S. pipeline accidents. See also list of natural gas and oil production accidents in the United States.

Incidents 

This is not a complete list of all pipeline accidents. For natural gas alone, the Pipeline and Hazardous Materials Safety Administration (PHMSA), a United States Department of Transportation agency, has collected data on more than 3,200 accidents deemed serious or significant since 1987.

A "significant incident" results in any of the following consequences:
 fatality or injury requiring in-patient hospitalization
 $50,000 or more in total costs, measured in 1984 dollars
 liquid releases of five or more barrels (42 US gal/barrel)
 releases resulting in an unintentional fire or explosion

PHMSA and the National Transportation Safety Board (NTSB) post incident data and results of investigations into accidents involving pipelines that carry a variety of products, including natural gas, oil, diesel fuel, gasoline, kerosene, jet fuel, carbon dioxide, and other substances. Occasionally pipelines are repurposed to carry different products.

 In January, a Mid-Valley owned and Sunoco operated pipeline ruptured, spilling  of oil into the Kentucky and Ohio rivers. The U.S. Environmental Protection Agency fined the companies $2.5 million for the spill.
 On January 18, an Enbridge pipeline failed from temperature problems, causing a spill of 100 barrels of crude oil in Bay City, Michigan. The pipe was just two years old at the time.
 On January 26, a Mid Valley 22-inch pipeline ruptured in Carrollton, Kentucky, spilling about 290,000 gallons of crude oil. Some of the crude entered the Ohio River. The pipe failure was caused by earth movement.
 On February 1, an ExxonMobil gasoline pipeline fire forced 43 families from their houses near Allentown, Pennsylvania. The fire burned for over 72 hours. There were no reported injuries.
 On or about February 28, 2005, approximately 2,497 barrels of Jet A Kerosene discharged from a 14-inch TEPPCO pipeline, reaching the Big Cow Creek, flowing into the Sabine River, near Newton, Texas. The discharge was caused by the over-tightening of a coupling at a 3/8-inch cooling line at the top of a 14-inch mainline pump.
 On March 15, 2005, the Kinder Morgan Tejas pipeline at Nacogdoches, Texas, had a “significant event” due to incorrect operation.
 On March 16, a crew installing a communications cable nicked a gas distribution pipeline in Moon Township, Pennsylvania. The crew then notified the local One Call center, but failed to alert first responders. two hours after the nick, gas exploded in a house, burning two teenagers there.
 On April 1, a Kinder Morgan Energy Partners petroleum products pipeline leaked gasoline near Truckee, California. Gasoline spread into Summit Creek, then, into Donner Lake. About 300 gallons spilled. The cause of the leakage was stress corrosion cracking.
 On May 4, a petroleum products pipeline failed near El Dorado, Kansas, spilling about 78,000 gallons of diesel fuel, of which about 46,000 gallons were lost. The pipeline failed from external corrosion.
 On May 13, an underground natural gas pipeline exploded near Marshall, Texas, sending a giant fireball into the sky and hurling a  section of pipe onto the grounds of a nearby electric power generating plant. Two people were hurt. The OPS concluded that stress corrosion cracking was the culprit.
 On May 13, the 30-inch Seaway Pipeline, operated by TEPPCO at the time, failed in Bryan County, Oklahoma, spilling approximately 898 barrels of crude oil. Oil reached Eastman Creek. The discharge was caused by a 6-inch longitudinal seam split on the pipeline that resulted from a stress crack that may have been induced by conditions occurring during rail transport of the pipe, and enlarged by pressure-cycle-induced stresses over years of operation of the pipeline.
 On May 23, a Magellan Pipeline petroleum products pipeline broke near Kansas City, Kansas, spilling gasoline into the nearby Missouri River. About 2,936 barrels of gasoline were spilled, with about 2,400 barrels being lost.
 On May 28, a  Kinder Morgan Energy Partners pipeline ruptured in El Paso, Texas, releasing gasoline.
 On June 7, during replacement of an Enterprise Products pipeline pigging facility in Mirando City, Texas, HVL gases leaked past a stopple. The gases were ignited by a nearby air compressor, killing one of the repair crew.
 On August 11, a bulldozer hit a Sunoco crude oil pipeline, north of Lufkin, Texas. The escaping crude ignited, injuring the bulldozer operator. About 18,500 gallons of crude oil were lost.
 On August 18, a leak was detected in an insulating flange along the BP Amoco Whiting to River Rouge pipeline at a monitoring well in Granger, Indiana. Initially, the bolts and nuts were replaced around the flange to mitigate any leaks; on August 25, when supply concerns diminished, the insulating flange was cut out and replaced with a straight section of pipe. Approximately 21 gallons of gasoline were removed from the ground, with no injuries or fatalities. Metallurgical analysis revealed that the fiber ring joint gasket had evidence of a prior leak.
 On August 29 Hurricane Katrina caused a protective levee to fail near Nairn, Louisiana in Plaquemines Parish, Louisiana, causing a Shell 20-inch pipeline to rupture. About 13,400 gallons were spilled, with about 10,500 gallons of this spill reaching the shoreline, and coastal marshes.
 In August, Hurricane Katrina damaged numerous offshore pipelines, in the Gulf of Mexico region.
 On September 18, a pipeline pumping station employee was killed in Monroe, Ohio, when leaking propane was ignited by an arcing pump, causing an explosion.
 On October 25, 2005, a Kinder Morgan pipeline at Texas City, Texas, had a weld failure that caused control/relief equipment to malfunction.
 On November 9, 2005, a house explosion in Lexington, MA injured two, destroyed a home and led to evacuation of 1800 homes. The cause was an accidental over pressurization of a gas main.
 On November 23, at the Sunoco Darby Creek Tank Farm in Sharon Hill, Pennsylvania, a major crude oil spill occurred from misoperation of tank valves. About 436,000 gallons of crude were spilled, with most of that recovered.
 On December 6, a natural gas compressor station exploded near Rifle, Colorado, about 200 yards from Interstate 70. There was only one minor injury to a nearby truck driver.
 On December 13, workers removing an underground oil tank in Bergenfield, New Jersey undermined a 1 1/4-inch steel gas pipeline. The gas line later failed, causing an explosion. Three residents of a nearby apartment building were killed. Four other residents and a tank removal worker were injured. Failure to evacuate the apartment building after the gas line ruptured was listed as a contributing factor.
 On December 25, a Sunoco 16 inch crude oil pipeline was discovered to be leaking by a landowner, in Cisco, Texas. About 47,500 gallons of crude were spilled, with only about 4,200 gallons recovered. About 2,500 cubic yards of soil were removed in the clean up. The cause was internal corrosion.

References 

Lists of pipeline accidents in the United States
2005 disasters in the United States